North Korea (Democratic People's Republic of Korea) participated at the 2010 Winter Olympics in Vancouver, British Columbia, Canada. The team consisted of two athletes in two sports. They did not medal at these Olympics.

Figure skating

Speed skating 

Ko Hyon-suk finished 13th in the 1000 meter race.

She finished ninth in the 500 meter race.

Women

References

2010 in North Korean sport
Nations at the 2010 Winter Olympics
2010